The Association of Jewish Refugees (AJR) is the specialist nationwide social and welfare services charity representing and supporting Jewish victims of Nazi oppression, and their dependants and descendants, living in Great Britain. The AJR celebrated its 75th anniversary in 2016 with a series of events including a reception at the Wiener Library in London and a two-day seminar at JW3, also in London.

Historical overview

The AJR was established on 20 July 1941 to support and represent the interests of the estimated 70,000 Jewish Refugees from German-speaking countries who fled to Britain to escape Nazi oppression before the Second World War. This number includes approximately 10,000 children who fled Nazi-controlled Germany, Austria and Czechoslovakia to Britain on the Kindertransport between December 1938 and August 1939.

As well as the refugees who arrived prior to the outbreak of the Second World War, AJR membership today includes several groups of post-war Jewish refugees from Europe including survivors from concentration camps and ghettos, child survivors as well as those who survived in hiding.

The children and grandchildren of refugees and survivors, the Second and Third Generations, are also entitled to be AJR members.

Social and welfare services

The AJR has specialist social and care workers dedicated to the daily needs of AJR members who require support and guidance on a wide range of social, welfare and care requirements.

As part of their nationwide programme of home visits, social care workers assess members' needs and, where appropriate, eligibility for a number of financial support schemes, designed to enable members to continue to live with dignity, comfort and security in their own homes for as long as possible.

On behalf of the Conference on Jewish Material Claims Against Germany the AJR administers emergency social, welfare and care funds, which can be used to pay for a number of services and essential items including dental treatment and specialist clothing as well as urgent house repairs, recuperative convalescence and respite breaks.  The largest proportion of these funds are used to support the Homecare programme.

Volunteers

Volunteers are a vital resource for the AJR who welcomes new applications from those looking for ways to get involved with the services they provide.

Aside from helping AJR care for their members, volunteers also gain from the experience.  Volunteering has many benefits.  It's good for mental and physical health, increases social circles and career opportunities and improves self-esteem and sense of purpose.

Individual Befriending

Many elderly AJR members, though still living in their own homes, are frail and often isolated. Some have few or no surviving family and can find themselves to be very lonely. A befriender, who can make regular visits, be someone to talk to and possibly go on walks with, would be very welcome. Currently, befrienders visit between 1-2hrs weekly, fortnightly, or even monthly.

Supporting Clients with Memory Loss

Memory loss can often leave a person feeling misunderstood, lonely and isolated.  A sensitive, caring, calm and intuitive person would find visiting somebody with memory loss extremely rewarding.  Volunteer befrienders are required to visit up to one hour a week/fortnight.  All volunteers receive specialised training and regular supervision.

Computer Help Project

Many AJR members would like to learn how to use a computer to keep in touch with family and friends abroad or generally learn how to use websites or online newspapers. Volunteers with basic computer skills (Word, Exel, Internet, etc.) visit them and assist them in using their computer. The time commitment will be about one hour every week or fortnight.

Telephone Befriending Project

The AJR has more than 600 members over the age of 90.  They may have been very active in their younger days, but many find that old age and ill-health means that they are less able to get out and feel isolated and lonely.  Often a telephone call can make a huge difference to their lives. Volunteers keep in telephone contact with our members on a regular basis building up a rapport.

My Voice

This project aims to tell the life stories of Jewish refugees and Holocaust survivors through the production of individual life story books to be kept as treasured memories and tools for reminiscence. The process involves several steps including visiting a member to record their life story, transcribing the interview, editing, photography and designing. Volunteers are invited to undertake one or more of the tasks and training is given. This project is currently running in Manchester, Leeds and London.

Outreach programme

The AJR operates a nationwide network of 44 regional groups that offer members a unique opportunity to socialize with friends of similar backgrounds.  Through this outreach programme the AJR has reunited former friends and acquaintances from more than 60 years ago.

In addition to organising local meetings, outings, coffee mornings, garden and tea parties, AJR outreach co-ordinators also arrange national and regional get-togethers.

Meals-on-Wheels

Meals on Wheels deliveries are made once a week on a Wednesday with a three-course meal, prepared by Josepha White caterers, costing £7, plus a £1 delivery charge for members living in certain areas in London.

Restitution and compensation claims

The AJR offers advice and assistance with claims for Holocaust-era compensation and the restitution of appropriated assets. As well as information about pensions, property and insurance policies, help is available for enquiries related to dormant bank accounts and lump sum reparations paid by individual governments or commissions. Although the deadlines for many reparation schemes have expired it is still possible to apply to certain programmes.

In addition to this guidance, the AJR lobbied the British Government to ensure that certain compensation awards are exempt from income, capital gains and inheritance taxes and that lump sum reparations are disregarded when calculating entitlement to social security benefits.

Through the Claims Conference, AJR assisted former forced and slave labourers with their claims to receive compensation from the Foundation "Remembrance, Responsibility and Future".

Kindertransport

The Kindertransport (KT) is a special interest group of AJR. It represents those victims who arrived in Britain as children by Kindertransports fleeing from Nazi-occupied Germany, Austria and Czechoslovakia prior to the start of the Second World War. The group arranges monthly meetings including guest speakers and regular activities. Current chairman of the Kindertransport planning committee is Sir Erich Reich.

Child Survivors Association

The Child Survivors Association (CSA) is also a special interest group of the AJR. The CSA committee arranges for guest speakers and the group offers mutual support in a relaxed social atmosphere where members can come together to discuss their experiences. The CSA is an affiliated member of the World Federation of Jewish Child Survivors of the Holocaust.

Holocaust education, research and AJR-supported projects

The AJR is committed to the education of future generations about the Holocaust. As well as supporting educational, research and commemorative projects, the AJR has produced several resources that will help create the legacy of the Jewish refugees and survivors shedding light on how they rebuilt their lies and their remarkable contribution to Britain.

The AJR Charitable Trust has given grants to institutions to develop programmes for the formal teaching of the Holocaust in schools, colleges and universities. It has also made grants to organisations that arrange and organise commemorative events, programmes and exhibitions.

AJR Refugee Voices

AJR has produced an audio-visual testimony archive entitled AJR Refugee Voices, which is a collection of over 250 filmed interviews.

AJR Refugee Voices enables Holocaust researchers and scholars to watch up to 450 hours of Holocaust testimony and read fully edited and transcribed accounts. Researchers are assisted by a searchable website and a catalogue with 44 separate categories and time-codes that, together with a summary sheet and key words section, direct users to specific sections of the films.

Each interview is accompanied by still shots of photos of family members and friends, places of importance for the interviewee and of other items or documents of special significance in the interviewee’s life.

In addition to exploring the contribution to Britain made by the refugees, the interviews cover the wide range of experiences of refugees and survivors and features interviews with Jewish Nazi victims who have rarely spoken about their experiences.

The project was directed Dr Anthony Grenville and Dr Bea Lewkowicz directing and is a resource for academics, researchers, educationalists and others with a professional interest in the field of refugee, migration and Holocaust studies. The collection has been designed precisely with the requirements of scholars and other professionals in mind.

Continental Britons

In conjunction with the Jewish Museum in London, the AJR produced the exhibition Continental Britons – Jewish Refugees from Nazi Europe, which presents the story of Jewish refugees who fled Nazi persecution in the German-speaking countries before the Second World War and came to Britain.

Continental Britons us illustrated with documents, photographs, personal memoirs, artefacts and art works, and has a concise and authoritative commentary. The exhibition follows the journey of the refugees, how they arrived, where they settled, and their experience of hostels, foster families and internment as ‘enemy aliens’. It also touches on the dilemmas and challenges faced by all refugees, past and present, such as the loss of a secure home, the difficulties of adjusting to a new culture and the reception by British society.

Memorial Books

The AJR has produced a series of Holocaust Memorial Books that honour the families of individual AJR members living in different areas of the country.

Kindertransport survey

The AJR commissioned and has now published the survey Making New Lives in Britain which has recorded the Continental background, journey to Britain, reception and subsequent experiences and lives of more than 1,300 former refugees who escaped to Britain on the Kindertransport.

International Holocaust Remembrance Alliance 

AJR Chief Executive Michael Newman is a member of the UK delegation to the International Holocaust Remembrance Alliance (IHRA), formerly the Task Force for International Cooperation on Holocaust Education, Remembrance, and Research (Holocaust Task Force), which consists of representatives of government, as well as governmental and non-governmental organisations.

Publications

All members of AJR receive the highly regarded monthly AJR Journal which combines topical news analysis with feature articles as well as book, theatre and film reviews along with the ever-popular letters page. It also contains profiles of personalities with a connection to the refugee community and promotes forthcoming AJR events and activities. The AJR Journal Archive contains links to every issue of the AJR Journal (formerly AJR Information) dating back to the first edition in January 1946.

Notes and references

External links
 Official website

External links
 Refugee Voices
 Conference on Jewish Material Claims Against Germany
 The Wiener Library
 Task Force for International Cooperation on Holocaust Education, Remembrance, and Research

Jewish organisations based in the United Kingdom
The Holocaust and the United Kingdom
Jewish emigration from Nazi Germany